Bala Mahalleh-ye Chubar (also Romanized as Bālā Maḩalleh-ye Chūbar) is a village in Chubar Rural District, Haviq District, Talesh County, Gilan Province, Iran. At the 2006 census, its population was 500, in 117 families.

Language 
Linguistic composition of the village.

References 

Populated places in Talesh County

Azerbaijani settlements in Gilan Province